Wané (Hwané, Ngwané) is a minor Kru language of Ivory Coast. It is not close enough to its nearest relative, Bakwé, to be readily intelligible, though some young Wané speak that language.

References

Kru languages
Languages of Ivory Coast